Ulrich I, Count of Württemberg (1226 – 25 February 1265), also known as Ulrich the Founder, was count of Württemberg from about 1241 until 1265.

Life 

Ulrich's relation to his predecessors is uncertain. The historian Hansmartin Decker Hauff labelled Ulrich as a son of Hermann of Württemberg and Irmengard of Ulten. Hermann, of which very little is known, is probably a son of Hartmann, Count of Württemberg.

Ulrich is believed to have been a cousin to Hartmann II, Count of Grüningen, and to have a paternal relation with Albert IV, Count of Dillingen.

He was twice married. From his marriage to Mechthild of Baden, daughter of Hermann V, he had two daughters, and a son, who succeeded him as Ulrich II. From his second marriage to Agnes of Schlesien-Liegnitz, he had another son, Eberhard I, and possibly another daughter.

Count of Württemberg 
The argument between Emperor Frederick II and the Popes Gregory IX and Innocent IV had effects on conditions in the duchy of Swabia, of which Württemberg was a part. After Frederick's excommunication and deposition by the Council of Lyon, Ulrich joined Anti-king Henry Raspe and William of Holland, against Frederick's son Conrad IV. With Ulrich's support, Conrad IV was defeated. Ulrich used the situation, to develop his power within Swabia. After the death of Conrad IV in 1254, however, his two-year-old son Conradin was recognized as Duke of Swabia. Conradin's guardian, Louis II, Duke of Bavaria, annexed the territories that Ulrich had gained from defeating Conrad IV, to Swabia. Ulrich was forced to concentrate on the middle Neckar valley as the basis of the county of Württemberg. His marriage to Mechthild of Baden allowed him to gain control of the region from the Margravate of Baden. Stuttgart, future capital of Württemberg was given to Württemberg by Baden as a wedding gift.

Issue 
with Mechthild of Baden, daughter of Hermann V of Baden
 Agnes of Württemberg
 Mechthild of Württemberg
 Ulrich II
with Agnes of Schlesien-Liegnitz, daughter of Bolesław II the Horned
 Eberhard I
 Irmengard of Württemberg

1226 births
1265 deaths
13th-century counts of Württemberg
Burials at Stiftskirche, Stuttgart
Royal reburials